"There Was a Man in Our Town", also known as "The Wondrous Wise Man" or "There Was a Man in Thessaly" is an English nursery rhyme.

There was a man in Thessaly,
And he was wondrous wise,
He jumped into a thorn bush,
And scratched out both his eyes

And when he saw his eyes were out,
He danced with might and main,
Then jumped into another bush
And scratched them in again.

or

There was a man in our town,
And he was wondrous wise,
He jumped into a bramble-bush,
And scratched out both his eyes;
And when he saw his eyes were out,
With all his might and main
He jumped into another bush
And scratched them in again.

It is believed to be based on the Greek myth of Bellerophon attempting to ascend Mount Olympus, in which Zeus send a gadfly to bite the winged horse, causing Bellerophon to be thrown into a bramble bush.

In popular culture
L. Frank Baum used it as one of the selection in his Mother Goose in Prose (1897).  In that version, the wise man only thought his eyes were out because his glasses were tightly forced against his closed eyes.
Jay N. Darling used it in a political cartoon dated 24 September 1906, a mockery of William Jennings Bryan's push for the silver standard.
Karl Llewellyn used the poem as the epigraph for his legal philosophy book The Bramble Bush (1930).

Sources
https://www.mamalisa.com/?t=es&p=1666
http://www.rhymes.org.uk/a92-there-was-a-man-in-thessaly.htm
https://books.google.com/books?id=Lj4ZAAAAYAAJ&pg=PA55&lpg=PA55&dq=wondrous+wise+man&source=bl&ots=7cs0RN1ZfC&sig=sC0uBFZU7efpj3atioKUnmHbO6g&hl=en&sa=X&sqi=2&ved=2ahUKEwiKoZXkv-vcAhUrNOwKHThqBJAQ6AEwE3oECAQQAQ#v=onepage&q=wondrous%20wise%20man&f=false
https://en.wikisource.org/wiki/A_Book_of_Nursery_Rhymes/Part_VI
http://digital.lib.uiowa.edu/cdm/ref/collection/ding/id/10715

English nursery rhymes
English folk songs
English children's songs
Traditional children's songs